Kindlestown Castle is a castle and a National Monument in Delgany, Ireland.

Location

History
Kindlestown Castle is a late stone example of the hall house, commanding a good view of the countryside and the Irish Sea. The castle takes its name from its association with Albert de Kenley (Sheriff of Kildare in 1301), who is believed to have erected it in the late 13th century. Others give it an earlier date of 1225, associating it with Walter de Bendeville.

De Kenley married Joan, the widow of Ralph Mac Giolla Mocholmág (Sir Ralph Fitzdermot) in 1292 and had custody of his lands for his stepson, John Fitzdermot. He retained some of the land for himself as can be seen from a deed dated 1304, and may have built the castle to protect against attack from the native Irish. In 1301 the Uí Broin (O'Byrnes) burned down nearby Rathdown Castle; the occupants may have taken refuge at Kindlestown. But John Fitzdermot had not the stomach for the fight with the Irish, conveying the manor of Rathdown about 1305 to Nigel le Brun, Escheator of Ireland. In 1377 the Uí Broin took Kindlestown itself. It was recovered by Robert Wikeford, Lord Chancellor of Ireland, and it later passed into the possession of the Archbold family.

Around 1402 there was another attempt by the O'Byrnes to take over, but Donnacha O'Byrne was defeated by the Archbolds.

The Archbolds fell into debt and Edward Archbold sold Kindlestown to William Brabazon, 1st Earl of Meath in 1630.

Building

The northern wall and part of the eastern wall survive intact to parapet level, but the southern and western walls were demolished in the post-medieval period. The surviving castle, two storeys high, is built of rough limestone, and the main features consist of a small projecting tower in the north-west corner, an original barrel vault at ground-floor level, and an entrance (at ground-floor level) and mural staircase in the eastern wall. The windows are small defensive arrowslits in the exterior, widening into segmental-arched embrasures in the interior. Window-seats survive at first-floor level. The remains of a slated parapet and stone string-course are also visible in the front façade.

References

National Monuments in County Wicklow
Castles in County Wicklow